Nuevo Casas Grandes Municipal Airport  is an airport located in Nuevo Casas Grandes, Chihuahua, Mexico.

References

External links
 Grupo Aeroportuario Centro Norte de México

Airports in Chihuahua (state)